The following lists events that happened during 1898 in Chile.

Incumbents
President of Chile: Federico Errázuriz Echaurren

Events

Full date unknown 
 Francisco Bilbao Workers Party is founded.
 Quilpué is founded.

Births
 3 January - Carlos Keller (died 1974)
 26 August - Tomás Goyoaga (died 1937)
 22 November - Gabriel González Videla (died 1980)
 27 November - John Jackson (died 1958)

Deaths

References 

 
Years of the 19th century in Chile
Chile